The flame tail tetra (Aphyocharax erythrurus) is a  species of characin.  It is native to Venezuela.

Distribution 
South America Essequibo river basin in Guyana.

Appearance
The flametail tetra has a grey/silver body, a prominent red tail, and yellow eyes.

References

Characidae
Fish of Venezuela
Fish described in 1912
Characiformes